"Murder Was the Case" is a song by rapper Snoop Dogg from his debut album Doggystyle. The song was remixed for the 1994 soundtrack Murder Was the Case.

Alterations 
In 2008, LisaNova made a parody for 2008 presidential Republican candidate, John McCain called "Palin was the Choice" where she portrays McCain's running mate, Sarah Palin.

Chart performance

References 

1993 songs
1994 singles
Snoop Dogg songs
Songs written by Snoop Dogg
Songs written by Daz Dillinger
Song recordings produced by Dr. Dre
Gangsta rap songs
G-funk songs
Horrorcore songs
Death Row Records singles
Songs about death